Sakthi is a 1972 Indian Malayalam-language film, directed by Crossbelt Mani. The film stars Sheela, Ravichandran, Thikkurissy Sukumaran Nair and Adoor Bhasi. The film had musical score by V. Dakshinamoorthy.

Cast
Sheela
Ravichandran
Thikkurissy Sukumaran Nair
Adoor Bhasi
N. Govindankutty
T. K. Balachandran
Paravoor Bharathan
Jose Prakash
Paul Vengola
C. A. Balan
Philomina
Sreelatha
Jayan

Soundtrack
The music was composed by V. Dakshinamoorthy and the lyrics were written by Vayalar Ramavarma.

References

External links
 

1972 films
1970s Malayalam-language films